Cecilia Zoppelletto, is an Italian filmmaker. She is most notable as the director of critically acclaimed Congolese documentary La Belle At The Movies.

Personal life
She was born and raised in Padua, Italy. Since 1994, she has been based in London. She has a PhD in Film Studies from the University of Westminster.

Career
As her research, she did Decolonisation through ‘Development Films’: Constructing and Re-Constructing the Zairian Spirit on Film. Through the research, she explores the archives of the Democratic Republic of Congo and the country's national film image of post-independence.

She has worked as a news producer for the Italian national broadcasting company RAI. In the meantime, she worked as a TV host and writer for the Italian network 'Antenna Tre Nordest'. In 2015, she made the documentary La Belle At The Movies. The film gained critical acclaim and screened in the US, Belgium, UK and Democratic Republic of Congo. Then in 2017, she made the experimental short film Falling.

Filmography

See also
 Cinema of Africa

References

External links
 

Living people
Italian film directors
1967 births
People from Padua